"More and More" is a song written by Allan Reuss, Rainey Robinson, and Tommy Karen and performed by Andy Williams.  The song reached #2 on the adult contemporary chart, #45 in the UK, and #88 on the Billboard chart in 1967.

Other versions
Bing Crosby released a version of the song on his 1968 album, Hey Jude / Hey Bing!.

References

1967 singles
Andy Williams songs
Columbia Records singles
1967 songs